The Turkmen Ambassador in Washington, D.C. is the official representative of the Government in Ashgabat to the Government of United States.

List of representatives

See also
 Embassy of Turkmenistan, Washington, D.C.
 United States–Turkmenistan relations

References 

United States
Turkmenistan
Turkmenistan–United States relations